The Philadelphia Divisional Board of the North American GAA is the governing body of hurling, camogie, and Gaelic football in the Philadelphia metropolitan area.  It is affiliated to the North American Board. Its headquarters are at the Limerick Field Complex in Pottstown, Pennsylvania. Until the 2006 North American Convention, its territory included the Washington DC/Baltimore area.

History
The first recorded evidence of the Gaelic games in Philadelphia was in 1914 when a meeting is said to have been held at Philo Celtic Gaelic Football Club.

References

External links
 GAA official website
 Philly GAA official website
 North American Board official website
 Continental Youth Championships official website

Irish-American culture in Philadelphia
Irish-American culture in Pennsylvania
North American GAA
Gaelic games governing bodies in the United States